Wider Circles is the fifth studio album by American Appalachian band Rising Appalachia. It was recorded at Echo Mountain Recording in Asheville, North Carolina, and was released on July 17, 2015.

Background
Leah Song coined the term "Slow Music Movement" while preparing for a TedX talk. During their Wider Circles Rail Tour, the band travelled by Amtrak train. Song connected this with the "Slow Music Movement", which she described as exploring the question as to how music can be a public service, saying:

Critical reception
Amy Lieberman, who reviewed Wider Circles for NYS Music, wrote "Seamlessly covering the entire spectrum of musical genres, ranging from traditional music of the American South highlighting the banjo and fiddle, to world music featuring African drums, there’s something on this album for everyone to enjoy." Desdemona Dallas, reviewing for Lost in Sound, noted that "Songs 'Medicine' and 'Oh Death' light upon the Smith sisters’ wordsmithing ways as slam poets." Thandiwe Ogbonna, writing for No Depression, said

John Malkin, writing for Spirituality & Health Magazine noted that "The inviting songs of Wider Circles focus on community, gratitude, and healing." Not all reviewers were enthusiastic; Jonathan Levitt, writing for Blurt gave the album a 3-star review, yet summarized the album as "An organic chilled vibe that provides a much-needed antidote to the processed tripe found on the radio these days."

Track listing

References

Citations

Works cited

Rising Appalachia albums
2015 albums